Dyspyralis puncticosta, the spot-edged dyspyralis moth, is a species of moth in the family Erebidae. It is found in North America.

The MONA or Hodges number for Dyspyralis puncticosta is 8427.

References

Further reading

 
 
 

Hypenodinae
Articles created by Qbugbot
Moths described in 1908